Aziza Bennani (born 1943), is a Moroccan academic and politician.

Life
Born in Rabat, Bennani studied at Mohammed V University in Rabat. After an undergraduate degree in Spanish language and literature, she gained a PhD with a dissertation on Pedro Antonio de Alarcón. She also gained a doctorate from Paris X Nanterre with a thesis on Carlos Fuentes. She was head of the Department of Hispanic Studies at Mohammed V University from 1974 to 1988. In 1988 she became Dean of the Faculty of Letters at Hassan II Mohammedia University in Mohammédia.

IN 1994 Bennani was made high commissioner for the disabled, and she was secretary of state to the minister of higher education in Abdellatif Filali's 1997-8 government. In 1998 she was appointed ambassador to UNESCO, and in 2001 succeeded Sonia Mendieta de Badaroux as chair of UNESCO's executive board.

References

1943 births
Living people
Government ministers of Morocco
Moroccan women diplomats
Moroccan women academics
Literary critics of Spanish
Women critics
People from Rabat
Mohammed V University alumni
Permanent Delegates of Morocco to UNESCO
Women government ministers of Morocco
Academic staff of Mohammed V University
Moroccan anthropologists
Moroccan women anthropologists
Moroccan women ambassadors